The DaneAge Association (Danish: Ældre Sagen) is a Danish nonprofit membership organization that works for the protection of senior citizens' interests in the society. It was founded in 1986 and has about 650,000 members (2013).

Organisation
DaneAge has 217 local chapters across Denmark. Some 14,000 volunteers do voluntary social work, arrange local membership activities, local advocacy, etc.

Headquarters
The association's headquarters is located on the corner of Nørre Voldgade and Nørregade in central Copenhagen. It maintains a staff of about 100. The artist Bjørn Nørgaard has decorated the interior of the building. He has also designed a proposed glass dome which will create a new public space with views of the city centre. The plans were announced in 2013.

Magazine
Dane Age publishes the magazine Ældre Sagen Nu six times a year. It claims to be read by one third of all Danes aged 50+, placing it in the top three of all Danish magazines.

References

External links
 Official website

Political advocacy groups in Denmark
Organizations based in Copenhagen
1986 establishments in Denmark
Organizations established in 1986